Edward William Barnett (1835 - March 1895) was a Conservative Party politician.

He first contested Dover at the 1871 by-election, but was unsuccessful. He was then elected MP for the constituency in another by-election in 1873 before being defeated at the next election in 1874.

The short duration of his term from his election, which took place in an autumn recess, to the 1874 general election meant Barnett never took his seat in the House of Commons.

References

External links
 
 Edward William Barnett

Conservative Party (UK) MPs for English constituencies
UK MPs 1868–1874
People from Walsall
1835 births
1895 deaths
Members of the Parliament of the United Kingdom for Dover